The Repetto Formation is a Pliocene epoch sedimentary unit in the greater Los Angeles Basin composed primarily of sandstone and conglomerate.

Geology
The unit records deposition of a submarine fan environment at lower bathyal depths, and is recognized as a productive petroleum reservoir. 

The  formation is overlain by the Pico Formation, both of the Neogene period.

Classification
The Repetto Formation is equivalent in age to the Fernando Formation; some researchers consider it (as well as the overlying Pico Formation) to be a junior synonym based on benthic foraminifera stages. Other researchers maintain that the Repetto and Pico Formations are distinct stratigraphic units, and that the use of the name "Fernando Formation" should be stopped due to several issues with stratigraphic correlation and access to the type section.

See also

List of fossiliferous stratigraphic units in California

References 

Pliocene California
Geology of Los Angeles County, California
Geologic formations of California
Petroleum in California